Mkhedruli is the current Georgian script.

Mkhedruli (literally, "of horseman") may also refer to:

 Mkhedruli, a Georgian dance
 "Mkhedruli", a Georgian folk song